The 1978 World Shooting Championships was the 42nd edition of the global shooting competition World Shooting Championships, organised by the International Shooting Sport Federation.

Results

Men individual

Men team

Women individual

Women team

Medal table

See also
Trap World Champions
Skeet World Champions

References

External links

ISSF World Shooting Championships
World Shooting Championships